"Can't Tame Her" is a song by Swedish singer Zara Larsson. It was released on 26 January 2023 through Larsson's record label Sommer House as the lead single from her upcoming fourth studio album. It was written by Larsson, MNEK, Karl Ivert and Kian Sang (the latter two comprising Swedish duo Mthr), and produced by Mthr.

Background and promotion
Beginning in December 2022, Larsson posted snippets of the song on her TikTok and Twitter accounts, with the Official Charts Company calling the song an "effervescent 80s synth banger" that sounds "like a brilliant mash-up of The Weeknd's mammoth hit Blinding Lights and Ava Max's overlooked rammer Maybe You're The Problem". Larsson officially announced the song and its release date on 12 January 2023 through her social media accounts.

Larsson performed the song live for the first time on 27 January at the Swedish award show P3 Guld.

Composition and lyrics
"Can't Tame Her" is primarily propelled forward by 1980s-inspired synths. In an interview with Billboard, Larsson said that the song was "definitely pop" and a "banger that hits you right in the face". 

The lyrics of "Can't Tame Her" describe an independent, fun-loving woman who does what she wants. Larsson said that the song was inspired by the public's perception of celebrities, and how they confine celebrities to certain ways of behaviour.

Music video
The music video was released alongside the song on 26 January 2023. The music video shows Larsson in a "face-off with her wild side", and was shot in Prague.

Charts

Release history

References

2023 singles
2023 songs
Songs written by MNEK
Songs written by Zara Larsson
Zara Larsson songs